Liam Craig (born 27 December 1986) is a Scottish former professional footballer. He is an attack-minded creative midfield player who operates on the left side of midfield or in a central position. He has played for Falkirk, St Johnstone and Hibernian during a sixteen-year career. Upon retiring at the end of the 2020–21 season, he will become a coach with St Johnstone.

Career
Craig began his career at Ipswich Town and skippered the youth side to victory in the 2005 FA Youth Cup final. However, after finding it difficult to break into the first team he joined Falkirk in January 2006.

Craig moved to St Johnstone on a month's loan in December 2007 and scored on his home debut against Livingston. He then signed on loan until the end of the season with the Saints and then signed on a permanent basis in July 2008. A transfer tribunal ruled that Saints would pay Falkirk £25,000 for his services, with a further £12,000 if the club was promoted to the SPL during his time at McDiarmid Park and also 25% of any future transfer received by Saints from another club. Craig made over 200 appearances for St. Johnstone in his first spell. In his last game for St. Johnstone, Craig scored a goal which would help seal third position in the Scottish Premier League and qualification for the 2013–14 UEFA Europa League.

Craig signed a pre-contract agreement with Hibernian in January 2013. He scored his first goal for Hibs on 24 August, scoring twice in a 2–1 victory against Kilmarnock. Craig scored his first ever career hat-trick on 24 September, in a 2013–14 Scottish League Cup tie against Stranraer. Craig was appointed Hibs captain in November 2013 by new manager Terry Butcher. Shortly after this, on 2 January 2014, Craig scored the winner in the Edinburgh derby against city rivals Hearts from the penalty spot. Craig was not offered a new contract by Hibs at the end of the 2014–15 season, after they failed to secure promotion from the Scottish Championship.

In July 2015, Craig signed a one-year contract with St Johnstone. On 27 March 2017, he signed a new two-year contract, keeping him at McDiarmid Park until the summer of 2019.

On 29 December 2018, Craig played his 362nd game for St Johnstone and scored in a 2–0 away win over Dundee; This put him second place behind teammate Steven Anderson in the club's all-time appearances list. In the same week, he was also appointed as chairman of the PFA Scotland (players' union) management committee.

Craig was one of three St Johnstone players to sign a short-term six-month contract extension in May 2020, as the club formulated plans amid the ongoing coronavirus pandemic.

He announced his retirement at the conclusion of the 2020–21 season, at which point he will become a coach with St Johnstone.

Career statistics

Honours
Ipswich Town Youth
FA Youth Cup: 2004–05

St Johnstone
Scottish Cup: 2020–21
Scottish League Cup: 2020–21

References

External links
 
 

1986 births
Living people
People from Berwickshire
Sportspeople from the Scottish Borders
Scottish footballers
Association football midfielders
Ipswich Town F.C. players
Falkirk F.C. players
St Johnstone F.C. players
Hibernian F.C. players
Scottish Football League players
Scottish Premier League players
Scottish Professional Football League players
Scottish trade unionists